Konstantinos Gkaripis (born March 12, 1981, in Serres) is a Greek weightlifter. Gkaripis represented Greece at the 2008 Summer Olympics in Beijing, where he competed for the men's middle-heavyweight category (94 kg), along with his compatriot Anastasios Triantafyllou. He successfully lifted 160 kg in the single-motion snatch, and hoisted 200 kg in a two-part, shoulder-to-overhead clean and jerk, for a total of 360 kg, finishing only in fourteenth place.

References

External links
NBC 2008 Olympics profile

Greek male weightlifters
1981 births
Living people
Olympic weightlifters of Greece
Weightlifters at the 2008 Summer Olympics
Sportspeople from Serres
Mediterranean Games silver medalists for Greece
Mediterranean Games medalists in weightlifting
Competitors at the 2001 Mediterranean Games
21st-century Greek people